Macacine gammaherpesvirus 10 (McHV-10) is a species of virus in the genus Lymphocryptovirus, subfamily Gammaherpesvirinae, family Herpesviridae, and order Herpesvirales.

References 

Gammaherpesvirinae